Gyokchyan is an Armenian surname. Notable people with the surname include:

Hayk Gyokchyan (born 1989), Lebanese-Armenian basketball player, son of Tigran
Tigran Gyokchyan (born 1965), Lebanese-Armenian basketball coach 

Armenian-language surnames